The Statue of Jean Batten is located outside Auckland International Airport, New Zealand, and honours the life of New Zealand aviator Jean Batten.

The bronze statue is the work of Anthony Stones. It was unveiled on 5 October 1989 by the Governor-General of New Zealand, Sir Paul Reeves. It depicts Batten holding flowers in her left arm and waving with her right.

References

Monuments and memorials to women
Buildings and structures in Auckland
1989 sculptures
Batten, Jean
Statues of explorers
Cultural depictions of aviators
Cultural depictions of New Zealand women
Statues in New Zealand